Revenge of the Bandits (German:Brigantenrache) is a 1922 German silent film directed by Reinhard Bruck and starring Asta Nielsen, Bruno Decarli and Walter Brugman.

Cast
 Asta Nielsen as Brigantenbraut 
 Bruno Decarli as Reggiero  
 Walter Brugman as Danilo  
 Margit Barnay as Wirtstochter

References

Bibliography
 Grange, William. Cultural Chronicle of the Weimar Republic. Scarecrow Press, 2008.

External links

1922 films
Films of the Weimar Republic
German silent feature films
German black-and-white films
Films directed by Reinhard Bruck